Beach volleyball for the 2019 Island Games, was held at the Nuffield Pool (Open Area), Gibraltar.

Medal table

Results

References

2019 Island Games
2019
Island Games